This is a complete list of ice hockey players who were drafted in the National Hockey League Entry Draft by the New York Rangers franchise. It includes every player who was drafted, regardless of whether they played for the team.

Key

Draft picks
Note: Stats are updated through 17 January 2021

Supplemental Draft picks

See also
List of New York Rangers players

References

 
 
 

 
draft picks
New York Rangers